The IMOCA 60 Class yacht Hugo Boss 6 was designed by VPLP, Guillaume Verdier and Alex Thomson Racing and launched in the 2015 after being built Green Marine based in Hythe, England.

Racing results

Timeline

2015-2018 Hugo Boss 6

2019-2020 11th Hour Racing

2021 11th Hour Racing-Alaka'i

2022-Present Guyot Enviroment 
Boat purchased by Benjamin Dutreux for a 2024 Vendee Globe campaign.

References 

Individual sailing yachts
2010s sailing yachts
Sailing yachts designed by VPLP
Sailboat type designs by Guillaume Verdier
Vendée Globe boats
IMOCA 60
Sailboat types built in the United Kingdom